Charles Stanford (April 26, 1819 Watervliet (now Colonie), Albany County, New York – August 24, 1885) was an American merchant, newspaper publisher and politician from New York.

Life
He was the son of Josiah Stanford (1795–1862) and Elizabeth (Phillips) Stanford (1791–1873). He attended the common schools, Prattsburg Academy, and Clinton Liberal Institute. Then he became a contractor, and took part in railroad constructions. He married Jane E. Page, and they had several children.

During the early 1850s, he and his brothers, among them future Governor Leland Stanford (1824–1893), went to California, and opened a trading company there. Charles later returned to New York, being in charge of the East Coast branch of the company. In 1861, he settled on a farm in Niskayuna, Schenectady County, New York.

He was a member of the New York State Assembly (Schenectady Co.) in 1864 and 1865. He was a delegate to the 1864 National Union National Convention in Baltimore. In 1865, he established the Schenectady Daily Union.

He was a member of the New York State Senate from 1866 to 1869, sitting in the 89th, 90th (14th D.), 91st and 92nd New York State Legislatures (15th D.).

He was buried at the Albany Rural Cemetery in Menands, New York.

Sources
 The New York Civil List compiled by Franklin Benjamin Hough, Stephen C. Hutchins and Edgar Albert Werner (1870; pg. 444, 501 and 503)
 Life Sketches of the State Officers, Senators, and Members of the Assembly of the State of New York, in 1867 by S. R. Harlow & H. H. Boone (pg. 144ff)
 Stanford genealogy at Family Tree Maker

External links

1819 births
1885 deaths
Republican Party New York (state) state senators
People from Niskayuna, New York
People from Colonie, New York
19th-century American newspaper editors
Republican Party members of the New York State Assembly
Burials at Albany Rural Cemetery
American male journalists
19th-century American male writers
19th-century American politicians